Dicheniotes polyspila is a species of tephritid or fruit flies in the genus Dicheniotes of the family Tephritidae.

Distribution
Kenya.

References

Tephritinae
Insects described in 1924
Diptera of Africa
Taxa named by Mario Bezzi